Megachile inquirenda is a species of bee in the family Megachilidae. It was described by Schrottky in 1913.

References

Inquirenda
Insects described in 1913